The women's tournament of the rugby sevens at the 2022 South American Games was held from 7 to 9 October 2022 at the Estadio Héroes de Curupayty in Luque, Paraguay, a sub-venue outside Asunción. It was the third edition of the rugby sevens women's tournament at the South American Games since its first appearance in Santiago 2014.

The tournament served as qualifier for the 2023 Pan American Games, with the top two teams (excluding Chile and Brazil) qualifying to the women's rugby sevens tournament.

The two-times defending champions Brazil successfully retained their title by winning the gold medal and thus their third South American Games women's rugby sevens title after beating the hosts Paraguay 17–5 in the final. Colombia beat Argentina with a 14–7 score to win the bronze medal.

Paraguay and Colombia qualified for the 2023 Pan American Games as the Sudamérica Rugby representatives, besides Chile which qualified automatically as hosts and Brazil which had previously qualified via the 2022 Sudamérica Rugby Women's Sevens.

Schedule
The tournament was held over a 3-day period, from 7 to 9 October.

Teams
A total of nine ODESUR NOCs entered teams for the women's tournament.

Rosters

Each participating NOC had to enter a roster of 12 players (Technical manual Article 9).

Venue
All matches were played at the Estadio Héroes de Curupayty located within the Parque Olímpico cluster in Luque, Paraguay and owned by the Paraguayan Olympic Committee. The Estadio Héroes de Curupayty, which was remodeled in 2020, has a capacity for 3,000 spectators.

Results
All match times are in PYST (UTC−3).

Preliminary stage
The preliminary stage consisted of three groups of 3 teams, each group was played under round-robin format with the top two teams progressing to the Cup groups stage and the third placed team of each group advancing to the Challenge group.

Group 1

Group 2

Group 3

Cup & Challenge stage
The Cup stage consisted of two groups of 3 teams, each group was played under round-robin format with the top two teams progressing to the semi-finals and the third placed team of each group advancing to the fifth place match. The challenge group consisted of three teams and was played under the same format, with the top to teams advancing to the seventh place match and the bottom team ocupping the ninth place in the general ranking.

Cup group 1

Cup group 2

Challenge group

Final stage
The final stage consisted of the seventh place match, the fifth place match, the semi-finals and the bronze and gold medal matches. The semi-finals match-ups were:

Semifinal 1: Cup group 1 winners v Cup group 2 runners-up
Semifinal 2: Cup group 2 winners v Cup group 1 runners-up

Winners of semi-finals played the gold medal match, while losers played the bronze medal match.

Semifinals

Seventh place match

Fifth place match

Bronze medal match

Gold medal match

Final ranking

Medalists

Qualified teams for Pan American Games
The following four teams from Sudámerica Rugby qualified for the 2023 Pan American Games women's rugby sevens tournament, including Chile which qualified as hosts and Brazil which had previously qualified by winning the 2022 Sudamérica Rugby Women's Sevens in June 2022.

1 Bold indicates champions for that year. Italic indicates hosts for that year.

References

External links
 ASU2022 Rugby sevens Teams Female at ASU2022 official website.

Rugby sevens